Albert Hofmann (11 January 1906 – 29 April 2008) was a Swiss chemist known for being the first to synthesize, ingest, and learn of the psychedelic effects of lysergic acid diethylamide (LSD). Hofmann's team also isolated, named and synthesized the principal psychedelic mushroom compounds psilocybin and psilocin. He authored more than 100 scientific articles and numerous books, including LSD: Mein Sorgenkind (LSD: My Problem Child). In 2007, he shared first place with Tim Berners-Lee on a list of the 100 greatest living geniuses published by The Daily Telegraph newspaper.

Early life and education
Albert Hofmann was born in Baden, Switzerland, on 11 January 1906. He was the first of four children to factory toolmaker Adolf Hofmann and Elisabeth ( Schenk) and was baptized Protestant. When his father became ill, Hofmann obtained a position as a commercial apprentice in concurrence with his studies. At age 20, Hofmann began his chemistry degree at the University of Zürich, finishing three years later, in 1929. Owing to his father's low income, Albert's godfather paid for his education. Hofmann's main interest was the chemistry of plants and animals, and he later conducted important research on the chemical structure of the common animal substance chitin, for which he received his doctorate with distinction in 1929.

Career
Of his decision to pursue a career as a chemist, Hofmann provided insight during a speech he delivered to the 1996 Worlds of Consciousness Conference in Heidelberg, Germany:

Discovery of LSD

In 1929, Hofmann became an employee of the pharmaceutical/chemical department of Sandoz Laboratories (now a subsidiary of Novartis) as a coworker of Arthur Stoll, founder and director of the pharmaceutical department. He began studying the medicinal plant  (squill) and the fungus ergot as part of a program to purify and synthesize active constituents for use as pharmaceuticals. His main contribution was to elucidate the chemical structure of the common nucleus of the  glycosides (an active principle of Mediterranean squill). While researching lysergic acid derivatives, Hofmann first synthesized LSD on 16 November 1938. The main intention of the synthesis was to obtain a respiratory and circulatory stimulant (analeptic) with no effects on the uterus in analogy to nikethamide (which is also a diethylamide) by introducing this functional group to lysergic acid. It was set aside for five years, until 16 April 1943, when Hofmann reexamined it and discovered its powerful effects. He described what he felt as being:

Three days later, on 19 April 1943, Hofmann intentionally ingested 250 micrograms of LSD. This trip was not as pleasant, as he said those around him appeared to become demons, furniture shifted into wicked creatures and he himself felt demonically possessed. This day is now known as "Bicycle Day", because he began to feel the effects of the drug as he rode home on a bike. This was the first intentional LSD trip.

Hofmann's research with LSD influenced several psychiatrists, including Ronald A. Sandison, who developed its use in psychotherapy. Sandison's treatment at Powick Hospital in England received international acclaim.

Hofmann continued to take small doses of LSD throughout his life, and always hoped to find a use for it. In his memoir, he emphasized it as a "sacred drug": "I see the true importance of LSD in the possibility of providing material aid to meditation aimed at the mystical experience of a deeper, comprehensive reality."

Further research

Hofmann later discovered 4-Acetoxy-DET, a hallucinogenic tryptamine. He first synthesized 4-AcO-DET in 1958 in the Sandoz lab. Hofmann became director of Sandoz's natural products department and continued studying hallucinogenic substances found in Mexican mushrooms and other plants used by aboriginal people there. This led to the isolation and synthesis of psilocybin, the active agent of many "magic mushrooms". Hofmann also became interested in the seeds of the Mexican morning glory species , called  by natives.

He was able to obtain samples of it, but never succeeded in identifying its active compound, which has since been identified as salvinorin A. In 1963, Hofmann attended the annual convention of the World Academy of Arts and Sciences (WAAS) in Stockholm.

Later years

Interviewed shortly before his 100th birthday, Hofmann called LSD "medicine for the soul" and was frustrated by its worldwide prohibition. "It was used very successfully for ten years in psychoanalysis," he said, adding that the drug was misused by the counterculture of the 1960s, and then criticized unfairly by the political establishment of the day. He conceded that it could be dangerous if misused, because a relatively high dose of 500 micrograms has an extremely powerful psychoactive effect, especially if administered to a first-time user without adequate supervision.

In December 2007, Swiss medical authorities allowed psychotherapist Peter Gasser to perform psychotherapeutic experiments on patients with terminal-stage cancer and other terminal diseases. Completed in 2011, these represent the first study of the therapeutic effects of LSD on humans in 35 years; other studies had examined the drug's effects on consciousness and body. Hofmann acclaimed the study and reiterated his belief in LSD's therapeutic benefits. In 2008, he wrote to Steve Jobs, asking him to support this research; it is not known whether Jobs responded. The Multidisciplinary Association for Psychedelic Studies (MAPS) has supported psychoanalytic research using LSD, carrying on Hofmann's legacy and setting the groundwork for future studies.

Hofmann was a longtime friend and correspondent of German author and entomologist Ernst Jünger, whom he met in 1949. Jünger experimented with LSD with Hofmann; in 1970, Jünger published a book of his experiences taking several types of drugs, Approaches: Drugs and Intoxication.

Archives
After retiring from Sandoz in 1971, Hofmann was allowed to take his papers and research home. He gave his archives to the Albert Hofmann Foundation, a Los Angeles-based nonprofit, but the documents mostly sat in storage for years. The archives were sent to the San Francisco area in 2002 to be digitized, but that process was never completed. In 2013, the archives were sent to the Institute of Medical History in Bern, Switzerland, where they are being organized. Hofmann felt that everyone should try his drug.

Death
Hofmann died at the age of 102 from a heart attack, on 29 April, 2008, in Switzerland.

Honors and awards
The Swiss Federal Institute of Technology (ETH Zurich) honored him with the title DSc (honoris causa) in 1969 together with Gustav Guanella, his brother-in-law. In 1971 the Swedish Pharmaceutical Association granted him the Scheele Award, which commemorates the skills and achievements of the Swedish Pomerania chemist and pharmacist Carl Wilhelm Scheele.

Publications

Books
 LSD - mein Sorgenkind. Stuttgart: Klett-Cotta (1979);  translated: LSD—My Problem Child. New York: McGraw-Hill (1980)

Public speaking
 "Transcript of a Special Videotaped Message From Albert Hofmann to the Participants at the April 16 & 17, 1993 Symposiums on the 50th Anniversary of his Discovery of LSD." MAPS | Multidisciplinary Association for Psychedelic Studies, vol. 4, no. 2 (Summer 1993), p. 56.

See also
History of lysergic acid diethylamide
Drug design
Psychedelic therapy
James Fadiman
David E. Nichols
Alexander Shulgin
Owsley Stanley

References

Further reading
Horowitz, Michael. "Interview with Albert Hofmann", High Times (1976)
Nathaniel S. Finney, Jay S. Siegel: In Memoriam – Albert Hofmann (1906–2008). Chimia 62 (2008), 444–447, 
Roberts, Andy. Albion Dreaming: A Popular History of LSD in Britain (2008), Marshall Cavendish, U.K, 978-1905736270/1905736274
Hagenbach, Dieter and Lucius Werthmüller. Mystic Chemist: The Life of Albert Hofmann and His Discovery of LSD (Synergetic Press, 2013).

External links

Albert Hofmann Foundation
LSD: My Problem Child Career Autobiography
Insight Outlook  A book by Albert Hofmann
Erowid: Albert Hofmann Vault
Maps.org ("Stanislav Grof interviews Dr. Albert Hofmann")
Albert Hofmann – Daily Telegraph obituary
Watch Hofmann's Potion, a documentary on the origins of LSD
Albert Hofmann's life and articles 
LSD Returns—For Psychotherapeutics (Scientific American Magazine article)
Albert Hofmann and Visionary Mushrooms – includes hand-written molecular structures of LSD and psilocybin by Dr. Hofmann

1906 births
2008 deaths
Swiss chemists
People associated with the University of Zurich
University of Zurich alumni
Psychedelic drug researchers
Psychedelic drug advocates
Lysergic acid diethylamide
Swiss centenarians
Men centenarians
People from Baden, Switzerland